The women's 4 × 400 metres relay at the 2014 IAAF World Indoor Championships took place on 8–9 March 2014. The gold medal was won by the United States, with Jamaica and Great Britain taking the silver and bronze, respectively.

Doping
The Russian team finished fourth in the final and was later disqualified after Kseniya Ryzhova's doping sample from 7 March 2014 was found positive for trimetazidine.

Medalists

*Athletes who competed in heats only.

Records

Schedule

Results

Heats
Qualification: First 2 in each heat (Q) and the next 2 fastest (q) qualified for the final.

Final

References

Relay 4x400 metres
4 × 400 metres relay at the World Athletics Indoor Championships
2014 in women's athletics